"Annie's Song" (also known as "Annie's Song (You Fill Up My Senses)") is a song in  time written and recorded by American singer-songwriter John Denver. The song was released as the lead single from his eighth studio album Back Home Again. It was his second number-one song in the United States, occupying that spot for two weeks in July 1974. "Annie's Song" also went to number one on the Easy Listening chart. Billboard ranked it as the No. 25 song for 1974.

It went to number one in the United Kingdom, where it was Denver's only major hit single. Four years later, an instrumental version also became flautist James Galway's only major British hit.

Background
"Annie's Song" was written as an ode to Denver's wife at the time, Annie Martell Denver. Denver "wrote this song in July 1973 in about ten-and-a-half minutes one day on a ski lift" to the top of Aspen Mountain in Aspen, Colorado, as the physical exhilaration of having "just skied down a very difficult run" and the feeling of total immersion in the beauty of the colors and sounds that filled all senses inspired him to think about his wife. Annie Denver recalls the beginnings: "It was written after John and I had gone through a pretty intense time together and things were pretty good for us. He left to go skiing and he got on the Ajax chair on Aspen mountain and the song just came to him. He skied down and came home and wrote it down... Initially it was a love song and it was given to me through him, and yet for him it became a bit like a prayer."

"The first time I heard 'Annie's Song,' I told John  it had the same melody as Tchaikovsky's Fifth Symphony, Second Movement," says Milt Okun. "He walked over to the piano, sat for an hour and came back, and the only thing remaining from Tchaikovsky was the first five notes. It was fantastic."

Critical reception
Shawn M. Haney of Allmusic noted the song's expressive emotionality, calling it an "ever so romantic tearjerker". Haney praised "Annie's Song" as "one of Denver's finest achievements".  Billboard called it a "fine love song." Record World said that this "folk ballad, subtle and sweet, glows with a continental flair that should take it to all the right places."

Charts and certifications

Weekly charts

Year-end charts

Certifications

Ville Valo cover

On July 4, 2016, Ville Valo released a cover version of "Annie's Song" in Finnish, titled "Olet mun kaikuluotain" ("You're My Sonar"). The lyrics were by Hector, and the song had previously been recorded in 1976 by Freeman. Ville Valo's version was released as a tribute to Finnish label Love Records, who celebrated their 50th anniversary in 2016. Valo's version was also the first release from the label in over 30 years. Valo commented on the song, stating: "'Kaikuluotain' is a childhood favorite of mine, to the beat of which many a sleepless night ended up in tears. To this day it gives me cold shivers and goosebumps." The song would go on to reach number one on the Finnish Download Chart.

Valo's version also received a music video, directed by Ykä Järvinen. Released on July 11, 2016, the video features scenes of Valo walking around Helsinki, done in tribute to Aki Kaurismäki's film Calamari Union. The video received the Emma Award for Video of the Year in 2017.

Adaptations 

Supporters of Sheffield United use the melody of Annie's Song as The Greasy Chip Butty Song, a football chant with recast lyrics humorously extolling the virtues of life in Sheffield and as supporters of the club.

See also 
List of RPM number-one singles of 1974
List of number-one singles of 1974 (Ireland)
List of number-one singles from the 1970s (UK)
List of Hot 100 number-one singles of 1974 (U.S.)
List of number-one adult contemporary singles of 1974 (U.S.)

References

External links
 Annie's Song on YouTube

John Denver songs
Glen Campbell songs
1974 singles
Billboard Hot 100 number-one singles
Cashbox number-one singles
Irish Singles Chart number-one singles
RPM Top Singles number-one singles
UK Singles Chart number-one singles
Songs written by John Denver
Song recordings produced by Milt Okun
1974 songs
RCA Records singles
Football songs and chants
Popular songs based on classical music